Milton is an unincorporated community in Sumner County, Kansas, United States. As of the 2020 census, the population of the community and nearby areas was 155.

History
The first post office in Milton was established in the 1870s.  Milton has a post office with ZIP code 67106.

A railroad currently passed through the community from Conway Springs to Norwich.  Another railroad previously passed through the community from Viola to Harper.

Demographics

For statistical purposes, the United States Census Bureau has defined Milton as a census-designated place (CDP).

Education
The community is served by Kingman–Norwich USD 331 public school district.

References

Further reading

External links
 Sumner County map, KDOT

Census-designated places in Sumner County, Kansas
Census-designated places in Kansas